Hampshire was a county constituency of the Parliament of the United Kingdom, which returned two Knights of the Shire (Members of Parliament) to the House of Commons from 1295 until 1832. (Officially the name was The County of Southampton, and it was occasionally referred to as Southamptonshire.)

History
The constituency consisted of the historic county of Hampshire, including the Isle of Wight. (Although Hampshire contained a number of parliamentary boroughs, each of which elected two MPs in its own right, these were not excluded from the county constituency, and owning property within the borough could confer a vote at the county election. This was even the case for the town of Southampton; although Southampton had the status of a county in itself after 1447, unlike most cities and towns with similar status its freeholders were not barred from voting at county elections.)

As in other county constituencies, the franchise between 1430 and 1832 was defined by the Forty Shilling Freeholder Act, which gave the right to vote to every man who possessed freehold property within the county valued at £2 or more per year for the purposes of land tax; it was not necessary for the freeholder to occupy his land, nor even in later years to be resident in the county at all. In the 18th century, the electorate amounted to around 5,000 voters.

Uniquely for a county constituency before the Reform Act, elections in Hampshire were held at two polling places, the poll being first opened at Winchester and then, once all the mainland voters had been polled, adjourning to Newport for the convenience of the Isle of Wight voters. This concession, however, only slightly mitigated the difficulties caused by voters having to travel to the county town to exercise their franchise. During the American Revolutionary War, elections from 1779 to the 1783 Peace of Paris were in New Alresford instead of Winchester, because the existing law would have required soldiers stationed at Winchester to depart during the election, leaving prisoners of war unguarded.

Up to Elizabethan times, at least, the voters had to contend with these difficulties themselves: Neale quotes an allusion to Hampshire freeholders "fasting and far from home" at a by-election in 1566 as evidence that the practice of feeding the voters to encourage their attendance was not yet universal. But later it became normal for voters to expect the candidates for whom they voted to meet their expenses in travelling to the poll and to entertain them generously when they reached it, making the cost of a contested election almost prohibitive in a county as large as Hampshire. When the prime minister Lord North sent £2,000 of the King's money to assist the government candidates fighting an election in Hampshire in 1779, he wrote to the King that it "bore ... a very small part of the expense" – yet it was insufficient to win the election, one of the government candidates being defeated.

Contested elections were therefore generally rare, potential candidates preferring to canvass support beforehand and usually not insisting on a vote being taken unless they were confident of winning; although there was a contest at each of the four general elections from 1705 to 1713, at all but four of the remaining 23 general elections before 1832, Hampshire's two MPs were elected unopposed.

Hampshire elections may have been less corrupt than most, and the 19th century chronicler of electoral abuses in the Unreformed Parliament, Thomas Oldfield, notes of the constituency that "We do not find a single petition [since 1640] complaining of an undue election in this county!!!" – complete with three exclamation marks. In the 18th and early 19th century Hampshire's voters were consistently of a High Tory persuasion, and throughout the 18th century the county's MPs were almost invariably nominees of the Crown. This influence arose in particular because of the number of government employees (in the dockyards at Portsmouth and Gosport, the forts of the Isle of Wight, and customs-houses all along the coast), as well as the Crown's tenants in the New Forest. Hampshire sentiments seem nevertheless to have been strongly in favour of reforming the House of Commons (views, no doubt, fuelled by the presence of several notorious rotten boroughs in the county), and on several occasions it submitted substantial petitions to Parliament in favour of the Reform Bill or of earlier unsuccessful proposals along the same lines.

According to the census of 1831, at around the time of the Great Reform Act Hampshire had a population of approximately 315,000. From 1832 the Reform Act split the constituency into three, giving the Isle of Wight a single member of its own and dividing the remainder of the county into two two-member divisions, Northern Hampshire and Southern Hampshire. (There were also minor changes to the parliamentary boundary between Hampshire and Sussex.)

Members of Parliament

MPs 1295–1640

MPs 1640–1832

1653: Richard Norton;   Richard Major;   John Hildesley
1654: Richard Lord Cromwell;   Richard Norton;   Richard Major;   John St Barbe;   Robert Wallop;   Francis Rivet;   Edward Hooper;   John Bulkeley
1656: Richard Lord Cromwell;   William Goffe;   Robert Wallop;   Richard Norton;   Thomas Cole ;     John Bulkeley;   Edward Hooper;   Richard Cobb

Election results

Notes

References
Robert Beatson, A Chronological Register of Both Houses of Parliament (London: Longman, Hurst, Res & Orme, 1807) 
 John Cannon, Parliamentary Representation 1832 - England and Wales (Cambridge: Cambridge University Press, 1973)
 Lewis Namier and John Brooke, The House of Commons 1754-1790 (London: HMSO, 1964)
 J. E. Neale, The Elizabethan House of Commons (London: Jonathan Cape, 1949)
 T. H. B. Oldfield, The Representative History of Great Britain and Ireland (London: Baldwin, Cradock & Joy, 1816)
 J Holladay Philbin, Parliamentary Reform 1640-1832  (New Haven: Yale University Press, 1965)
 Edward Porritt and Annie G Porritt, The Unreformed House of Commons (Cambridge University Press, 1903)

Parliamentary constituencies in Hampshire (historic)
Constituencies of the Parliament of the United Kingdom established in 1295
Constituencies of the Parliament of the United Kingdom disestablished in 1832